Purslow is a hamlet in Shropshire, England.

Purslow may also refer to:
Nicholas Purslow, MP for Morpeth
Christian Purslow
Thomas Purslow, MP for Stafford 1572

See also
 Parslow, a surname